Hryhorii Ivanovych Makhno (24 January 1886 – 18 September 1919) was a Ukrainian rebel commander and brother of Nestor Makhno.

Biography
Hryhorii was born into a peasant family in the village of Huliaipole on 24 January 1886 to Ivan Rodionovych Mikhnenko and Evdokiia Matveevna Perederyi. His father died in 1889, leaving he and his brothers in the sole care of their mother. Hryhorii was married to a peasant woman Khristina, with whom he had two daughters: Maria and Elizabeth.

In 1907, he joined the anarcho-communist Union of Poor Peasants. When his brother Nestor Makhno was arrested for participating in the group, Hryhorii visited him in prison and told him of the death of their comrade Oleksandr Semenyuta. In the same year he was drafted into the Imperial Russian Army, in which he fought during World War I.

In 1918 he took part in the defense of the Donets-Krivoy Rog Soviet Republic as part of an anarcho-communist detachment, with which he retreated to Tsaritsyn. In Tsaritsyn, Hryhorii was appointed chief of staff of the 37th Brigade of the Red Army on the Tsaritsyn front.

In the spring of 1919, he returned to his native Huliaipole and joined the Revolutionary Insurgent Army of Ukraine (RIAU). When the Insurgents separated from the Red Army and began their retreat westward, Hryhorii joined the small detachment around his brother Nestor. For some time Hryhorii served as the chief of staff of the united rebel troops of Nestor Makhno and Nykyfor Hryhoriv, then as a member of the Military Revolutionary Council (VRS).

In early September 1919, the Insurgents clashed with the White movement around Pomichna, with the insurgent cavalry carrying out a series of raids into the White rear. According to Peter Arshinov, on 18 September 1919, Hryhorii Makhno was killed in battle with the Whites, alongside Petya Lyuty. After receiving news of his brother's death, an enraged Nestor responded by massacring the wounded White officers that the insurgents had captured.

Memory
Following the Insurgent victory over the Whites at the battle of Peregonovka, the insurgents captured an armored train, which they dubbed the “Memory of Hryhorii Makhno”. "Armored train in memory of the freedom fighter comrade Hryhorii Makhno" was written in red paint on the armored train, over the old inscription.

References

Bibliography

Further reading 
 

1886 births
1919 deaths
Anarchist partisans
Makhnovshchina
People from Huliaipole
Soviet military personnel of the Russian Civil War
Soviet people of the Ukrainian–Soviet War
Ukrainian anarchists
Ukrainian military personnel killed in action
Ukrainian people of World War I